Sebastiaan Steur (born 8 March 1984, in Naarden) is a Dutch former footballer who played as a striker. He formerly played for FC Volendam, SC Heerenveen, SBV Excelsior, Heracles Almelo and Spakenburg.

References

External links
 
 

1984 births
Living people
People from Naarden
Association football forwards
Dutch footballers
Excelsior Rotterdam players
SC Heerenveen players
Heracles Almelo players
FC Volendam players
SV Spakenburg players
Eredivisie players
Footballers from North Holland